Greiman is a surname. Notable people with the surname include:
 Alan J. Greiman (1931-2022), American judge and politician from Illinois
 April Greiman (born 1948), American designer

See also
 Jane Greimann (1942–2006), American politician from Iowa